Štěkeň is a market town in Strakonice District in the South Bohemian Region of the Czech Republic. It has about 800 inhabitants.

Administrative parts
Villages of Nové Kestřany and Vítkov are administrative parts of Štěkeň.

Notable people
Joseph Nicholas of Windisch-Graetz (1744–1802), Austrian nobleman; died here

References

Populated places in Strakonice District
Market towns in the Czech Republic
Prácheňsko